Møsnuken is a mountain in Bjørnafjorden Municipality in Vestland county, Norway.

See also
List of mountains of Norway

References

Bjørnafjorden
Mountains of Vestland